These 111 species belong to Parancistrocerus, a genus of potter and mason wasps in the family Vespidae.

Parancistrocerus species

 Parancistrocerus acarigaster (Bohart, 1952) c g
 Parancistrocerus acarophilus Giordani Soika, 1995 c g
 Parancistrocerus acarophorus (Bohart, 1952) c g
 Parancistrocerus acclivus Gusenleitner 2007 c g
 Parancistrocerus algidus (Schrottky, 1909) c g
 Parancistrocerus androcles (Meade-Waldo, 1910) c g
 Parancistrocerus areatus (Fox, 1902) c g
 Parancistrocerus assamensis (Meade-Waldo, 1910) c g
 Parancistrocerus assumptionis (Brethes, 1906) c g
 Parancistrocerus atkinsi Bequard & Salt, 1931 c g
 Parancistrocerus austrinus (Cresson, 1872) c g
 Parancistrocerus bacu (de Saussure, 1852) c g
 Parancistrocerus bacuensis (de Saussure, 1852) c g
 Parancistrocerus bicornis (Roberts, 1901) c g b
 Parancistrocerus binotatus (Fabricius, 1804) c g
 Parancistrocerus bonariensis (Brethes, 1906) c g
 Parancistrocerus bravo (de Saussure, 1857) c g
 Parancistrocerus capocacciai Giordani Soika, 1995 c g
 Parancistrocerus chiricahuae (Bohart, 1949) c g
 Parancistrocerus citropictus Giordani Soika, 1995 c g
 Parancistrocerus concavus (Brethes, 1906) c g
 Parancistrocerus coronado (Bohart, 1949) c g
 Parancistrocerus cotti (Bohart, 1952) c g
 Parancistrocerus cucullatus (Zavattari, 1912) c g
 Parancistrocerus cylindricus (de Saussure, 1862) c g
 Parancistrocerus cylindroides Giordani Soika, 1995 c g
 Parancistrocerus declivatus (Bohart, 1948) c g b
 Parancistrocerus declivus (Brethes, 1903) c g
 Parancistrocerus decollatus (Zavattari, 1912) c g
 Parancistrocerus dejectus (Cresson, 1865) c g
 Parancistrocerus difformis Giordani Soika, 1995 c g
 Parancistrocerus dorsonotatus (Fox, 1902) c g
 Parancistrocerus dux (Zavattari, 1912) c g
 Parancistrocerus enyo (Lepeletier, 1841) c
 Parancistrocerus farias (de Saussure, 1857) c g
 Parancistrocerus feai Giordani Soika, 1995 c g
 Parancistrocerus foveolatus (Brethes, 1906) c g
 Parancistrocerus fulvipes (de Saussure, 1856) c g b
 Parancistrocerus gracilior Giordani Soika, 1995 c g
 Parancistrocerus guzmani (de Saussure, 1857) c g
 Parancistrocerus herbertii (Fox, 1902) c g
 Parancistrocerus histrio (Lepeletier, 1841) c g b
 Parancistrocerus holmbergi (Brethes, 1906) c
 Parancistrocerus holmbergii (Brèthes 1906) c g
 Parancistrocerus holzschuhi Gusenleitner, 1987 c g
 Parancistrocerus hongkongensis Gusenleitner, 2002 c g
 Parancistrocerus ignotus Giordani Soika, 1995 c g
 Parancistrocerus incommodus (de Saussure, 1852) c g
 Parancistrocerus inconstans (de Saussure) c g
 Parancistrocerus incorruptus Giordani Soika, 1972 c g
 Parancistrocerus inflaticeps Giordani Soika, 1995 c g
 Parancistrocerus inornatus (Zavattari, 1912) c
 Parancistrocerus intermediatus (Sonan 1939) c
 Parancistrocerus invisibilis (Zavattari, 1912) c g
 Parancistrocerus irritatus Giordani Soika, 1972 c g
 Parancistrocerus kennethianus Giordani Soika, 1995 c g
 Parancistrocerus kolambuganensis Schulthess, 1934 c g
 Parancistrocerus kuraruensis (Sonan 1939) c
 Parancistrocerus leionotus (Viereck, 1906) c g b
 Parancistrocerus longicornutus (Dalla Torre, 1904) c g
 Parancistrocerus lutzi Bequard & Salt, 1931 c g
 Parancistrocerus luzonicola Vecht, 1981 c g
 Parancistrocerus lynchii (Brethes, 1903) c g
 Parancistrocerus macfarlandi (Cameron, 1909) c g
 Parancistrocerus makilingi Giordani Soika, 1995 c g
 Parancistrocerus malayanus Giordani Soika, 1995 c g
 Parancistrocerus mcclayi (Bohart, 1952) c g
 Parancistrocerus microsynoeca (Schrottky, 1909) c g
 Parancistrocerus minimoferus (Bohart, 1949) c g b
 Parancistrocerus nigriventris Giordani Soika, 1995 c g
 Parancistrocerus nitobei (Sonan, 1939) c g
 Parancistrocerus obliquus (Cresson, 1865) c g
 Parancistrocerus olseni Bequard & Salt, 1931 c g
 Parancistrocerus parapedestris (Bohart, 1952) c g
 Parancistrocerus paulensis (Zavattari, 1912) c g
 Parancistrocerus pedestris (de Saussure, 1856) c g b
 Parancistrocerus pensylvanicus (de Saussure, 1856) c g b
 Parancistrocerus perennis (de Saussure, 1857) c g b
 Parancistrocerus polingi (Bohart, 1949) c g
 Parancistrocerus productus (Smith, 1862) c g
 Parancistrocerus pruinosus (Smith, 1857) c g
 Parancistrocerus pseudallodynerus Giordani Soika, 1995 c g
 Parancistrocerus pseudodynerus (Dalla Torre, 1889) c g
 Parancistrocerus rectangulis (Viereck, 1908) c g
 Parancistrocerus rhipheus (Cameron, 1904) c g
 Parancistrocerus robertianus (Cameron) c g
 Parancistrocerus saecularis (de Saussure, 1852) c g
 Parancistrocerus salcularis  b
 Parancistrocerus saltensis (Brethes, 1906) c g
 Parancistrocerus samarensis (Schulthess, 1934) c g
 Parancistrocerus scapultatus (Zavattari, 1912) c g
 Parancistrocerus siamensis Gusenleitner, 2003 c g
 Parancistrocerus siccus (Bohart, 1952) c g
 Parancistrocerus striatus (Fox, 1902) c g
 Parancistrocerus subcyaneus (Brèthes, 1909) c g
 Parancistrocerus subtoltecus (Viereck, 1906) c g
 Parancistrocerus sulcatus Giordani Soika, 1995 c g
 Parancistrocerus sumichrasti (de Saussure, 1857) c g
 Parancistrocerus taihorinensis (Schulthess, 1934) c g
 Parancistrocerus taihorinshoensis (Schulthess, 1934) c g
 Parancistrocerus taikonus (Sonan 1939) c g
 Parancistrocerus texensis Saussure, 1871 c g b
 Parancistrocerus toltecus (de Saussure, 1857) c b
 Parancistrocerus trepidus (Zavattari, 1912) c g
 Parancistrocerus triconcavus Giordani Soika, 1995 c g
 Parancistrocerus ussuriensis Kurzenko, 1981 c g
 Parancistrocerus vagus (de Saussure, 1857) c g b
 Parancistrocerus vicinus Giordani Soika, 1995 c g
 Parancistrocerus vogti Kromb., 1962 c g
 Parancistrocerus yachowensis Giordani Soika, 1986 c g
 Parancistrocerus yamanei Gusenleitner, 2000 c g

Data sources: i = ITIS, c = Catalogue of Life, g = GBIF, b = Bugguide.net

References

Parancistrocerus